Avatar is an American media franchise created by James Cameron, which consists of a planned series of epic science fiction films produced by Lightstorm Entertainment and distributed by 20th Century Studios, as well as associated merchandise, video games and theme park attractions. The Avatar franchise is one of the most expensive franchises ever undertaken, with the combined budget of the first film and its four sequels estimated at $1 billion. The franchise has grossed over $5.2 billion worldwide; it is the 13th-highest-grossing film series of all time.

The first installment, Avatar, was released on December 18, 2009, and is the highest grossing film of all-time. The second installment, The Way of Water, was released on December 16, 2022. The planned sequel series was announced by 20th Century Fox on December 11, 2009, one week before Avatar was released to theaters. 20th Century Fox had confirmed the series on January 15, 2010.

Like the original film, the four sequels have "fully encapsulated" standalone plots that "come to their own conclusions". The four films have an overarching meta-narrative that connects them to create a large interconnected saga. Cameron described the sequels as "a natural extension of all the themes, and the characters, and the spiritual undercurrents" of the first film.

Films

Avatar (2009)

The story focuses on an epic conflict on Pandora, an inhabited Earth-sized moon of Polyphemus, one of three gas giants orbiting Alpha Centauri A. On Pandora, human colonists and the sentient humanoid indigenous inhabitants of Pandora, the Na'vi, engage in a war over the planet's resources and the latter's continued existence. The film's title refers to the remotely controlled, genetically engineered human-Na'vi bodies used by the film's human characters to interact with the natives.

Avatar: The Way of Water (2022)

Set over a decade after the events of the first film, The Way of Water focuses on the return of the RDA, which prompts Jake's family to explore the water regions of Pandora in an effort to keep one another safe and face down a familiar threat. Cameron said in an interview that while the first film was about the "awe and wonder", the sequel focuses more on the characters. The film was originally planned for a December 2014 release, but was delayed several times and released on December 16, 2022. Production began in August 2017. It wrapped in September 2020.

Avatar 3 (2024)

A third film is planned for December 20, 2024. Interviews in mid 2010 suggested that the third film would explore more of the Alpha Centauri system, but the script was not completed until late 2015. Avatar 3 started shooting simultaneously with Avatar: The Way of Water in New Zealand on September 25, 2017; filming was completed in late-December 2020. The third film will introduce a new aggressive Na'vi Clan known as 'Ash People' who reside near Volcanoes.

Avatar 4 (2026)

A fourth film is planned for December 18, 2026. Jon Landau said that, due to a six-year time skip in the first act, a third of Avatar 4 has already been filmed to account for the aging of the child actors, and on September 9, 2022, it was announced at the D23 Expo that principal photography had officially begun for Avatar 4.

Avatar 5 (2028)
A fifth and final film has been announced and is scheduled for December 22, 2028. Jon Landau has stated that part of Avatar 5 will take place on Earth, with Neytiri visiting the planet.

Cast and characters

Production details

Reception

Box office performance 
The first film grossed $2.92 billion worldwide and is the highest-grossing film in history. The second film, The Way of Water, has grossed $2.29 billion worldwide and currently ranks as the third highest-grossing film. The third, fourth, and fifth films in the series are expected to have a budget of $250 million.

Critical and public response

Accolades

Music
 Avatar: Music from the Motion Picture was scored by James Horner and released on December 15, 2009, by Atlantic Records and Fox Music. 
 Avatar: The Way of Water (Original Motion Picture Soundtrack) was scored by Simon Franglen and released on December 15, 2022, by Hollywood Records.

Singles
 "I See You (Theme from Avatar)"
 "Nothing Is Lost (You Give Me Strength)"

Other media

Video games

Novels 
Following the release of Avatar, Cameron initially planned to write a novel based on the film, "telling the story of the movie, but [going] into much more depth about all the stories that we didn't have time to deal with."

In 2013, this plan was superseded by the announcement of four new novels set within the "Avatar expanded universe", to be written by Steven Gould. The books were due to be published by Penguin Random House, although since 2017, there has been no update on the planned book series.

In July 2022, the first graphic novel based on the Avatar franchise was announced.

Books 
The Art of Avatar is a film production art book released on November 30, 2009, by Abrams Books.

The World of Avatar: A Visual Exploration Is a book that celebrates, explores, and explains the spectacular world of Pandora. The book was released on May 31, 2022, by DK Books

The Art of Avatar The Way of Water  takes an exclusive look behind-the-scenes on the production and creative process of James Cameron’s Avatar: The Way of Water.  It was released on December 16, 2022, by DK Books

Avatar The Way of Water The Visual Dictionary  is a visual guide that showcases characters, vehicles, weapons, locations, and more from the movie, as well as many stunning exclusive details. This book was released on December 16, 2022, by DK Books

Comic books 
In October 2015, Dark Horse Comics signed a 10-year partnership to publish Avatar comics.

On May 6, 2017, Dark Horse Comics published a Free Comic Book Day one-shot entitled FCBD 2017: James Cameron's Avatar / Briggs Land, which included a short story set in the world of Avatar entitled "Brothers".
From January to August 2019, Dark Horse published a six-issue miniseries called Avatar: Tsu'tey's Path.
Tsu'tey's Path was collected in trade paperback format on November 27, 2019, with "Brothers" included as supplementary material.

Collected editions

Live show 

Toruk – The First Flight is an original stage production by the Montreal-based Cirque du Soleil which ran between December 2015 and June 2019. Inspired by Avatar, the story is set in Pandora's past, involving a prophecy concerning a threat to the Tree of Souls and a quest for totems from different tribes. Audience members could download an app in order to participate in show effects. On January 18, 2016, it was announced via the Toruk Facebook page that filming for a DVD release had been completed and was undergoing editing.

Exhibition 
Avatar The Exhibition is a touring exhibition based on the first film. It opened in Chengdu, China on May 1, 2021, and closed on December 31, 2021. It is currently touring Asia with future stops planned around the globe.

Theme park attractions 

In 2011, Cameron, Lightstorm, and Fox entered an exclusive licensing agreement with the Walt Disney Company to feature Avatar-themed attractions at Walt Disney Parks and Resorts worldwide, including a themed land for Disney's Animal Kingdom in Lake Buena Vista, Florida. The area, known as Pandora – The World of Avatar, opened on May 27, 2017. The themed land is set generations after the events of the films and features two attractions: Avatar Flight of Passage, a flying simulator attraction, and Na'vi River Journey, a boat dark ride.

In February 2023, Disney CEO Bob Iger announced that a new attraction based on the Avatar films, named the Avatar Experience, would open at Disneyland.

Cultural considerations 
Some indigenous groups around the world including some Native Americans have called for a boycott of the franchise over "tone-deaf" handling of indigenous cultures and cultural appropriation. Both Avatar films have drawn criticism for casting several white and other non-indigenous actors in the roles of the alien native people. Cameron said he tried to move away from a white savior narrative. The film series was criticized for "romanticization of colonization" and putting forward a monolithic portrayal of Indigenous people.

Cameron also faced criticism for comments made after the release of the first film. In 2010, Cameron and Avatar actors supported the Xingu peoples in opposing the construction of the Belo Monte Dam.

In 2012, Cameron said Avatar is a fictional retelling of the history of North and South America in the early Colonial period, “with all its conflict and bloodshed between the military aggressors from Europe and the indigenous peoples”.

Notes

References

External links
 

 
20th Century Studios franchises
Science fiction film franchises
Film series introduced in 2009